Agrilus concinnus is a species of metallic wood-boring beetle in the family Buprestidae. It is found in North America.

References

Further reading

External links

 

concinnus
Articles created by Qbugbot
Beetles described in 1891